Pedro Emanuel da Silva Fernandes (born 17 January 1985) is a Portuguese football player who plays for GD Bragança.

Club career
He made his professional debut in the Segunda Liga for Desportivo das Aves on 14 February 2010 in a game against Penafiel.

References

1985 births
Living people
People from Vila Real, Portugal
Portuguese footballers
S.C. Dragões Sandinenses players
UD Salamanca players
FC Porto players
S.C. Braga players
C.S. Marítimo players
C.D. Aves players
SC Mirandela players
CS Pétange players
GD Bragança players
Sertanense F.C. players
Liga Portugal 2 players
Luxembourg National Division players
Association football goalkeepers
Portuguese expatriate footballers
Portuguese expatriate sportspeople in Spain
Expatriate footballers in Luxembourg
Portuguese expatriate sportspeople in Luxembourg
Expatriate footballers in Spain
Sportspeople from Vila Real District